The 1950 ICF Canoe Sprint World Championships were held in Copenhagen, Denmark. This event was held under the International Canoe Federation.

The men's competition consisted of four Canadian (single paddle, open boat) and nine kayak events. Two events were held for the women, both in kayak. Events that debuted at these championships were C-1 10000 m and K-4 10000 m.

This was the third championships in canoe sprint.

Medal summary

Men's

Canoe

Kayak

Women's

Kayak

Medals table

References
ICF medalists for Olympic and World Championships - Part 1: flatwater (now sprint): 1936-2007.
ICF medalists for Olympic and World Championships - Part 2: rest of flatwater (now sprint) and remaining canoeing disciplines: 1936-2007.

Icf Canoe Sprint World Championships, 1950
Icf Canoe Sprint World Championships, 1950
ICF Canoe Sprint World Championships
International sports competitions hosted by Denmark
Canoeing in Denmark